The 1980 Utah gubernatorial election was held on November 4, 1980. Democratic incumbent Scott M. Matheson defeated Republican nominee Bob Wright with 55.16% of the vote. As of 2023, this is the last time a Democrat was elected Governor of Utah.

General election

Candidates
Scott M. Matheson, Democratic
Bob Wright, Republican
Lawrence Rey Topham, American Party

Results

References

1980
Utah
Gubernatorial